Admir Teli (born 2 June 1981) is an Albanian retired professional footballer who played as a defender. He spent most of his career in Albania and Azerbaijan, where he collected more than 400 appearances by representing Vllaznia Shkodër and Qarabağ, winning six major trophies in the process.

Teli began his senior international career in 2006 with Albania and went on earning 19 caps until 2013.

Club career
Teli played for Elbasani in the 2005–06 Albanian Superliga season. After playing well for the club, he was given a surprise move to the biggest team in Albania, Tirana. However, he only ended up spending a few months at the club because he moved to Vllaznia Shkoder only two months later. He enjoyed a good spell there, notably winning the cup in the 2007–08 season.

In the summer of 2008, Teli along with two other players from Vllaznia Shkoder moved to Turkey after they had been spotted by the Turkish club Gençlerbirliği, along with Gilman Lika, Teli got a contract with the reserve team of Gençlerbirliği, Hacettepe Spor Kulübü, for whom he played in 16 Süper Lig matches. But the young Albanian striker Xhevahir Sukaj managed to get a contract with the parent team Gençlerbirliği.

In January 2009 he has signed a two-year contract with Azerbaijan Premier League team FK Qarabağ. Teli left Qarabağ at the end of the 2014–15 season.

International career
Teli has been a former member of Albania national team whom he collected 19 caps.

Career statistics

Club
Source:

International
Source:

Honours
Vllaznia Shkodër
Albanian Superliga: 2000–01
Albanian Cup: 2007–08
Albanian Supercup: 2001

Qarabağ
Azerbaijan Premier League: 2013–14, 2014–15
Azerbaijan Cup: 2008–09

References

External links
 Profile on official club website

1981 births
Living people
Footballers from Shkodër
Albanian footballers
Association football defenders
Albania international footballers
KF Vllaznia Shkodër players
Hacettepe S.K. footballers
Qarabağ FK players
Kategoria Superiore players
Süper Lig players
Albanian expatriate footballers
Expatriate footballers in Turkey
Albanian expatriate sportspeople in Turkey
Expatriate footballers in Azerbaijan
Albanian expatriate sportspeople in Azerbaijan